Ndokwa West is a Local Government Area of Delta State, Nigeria. Its headquarters are in the town of Kwale (Utagba-Ogbe).
 
It has an area of 816 km and a population of 149,325 at the 2006 census. Notable communities in Ndokwa West include: Utagbe Ogbe, Emu, Ogume, Abbi, Utagbe Uno, Onicha-Ukwuani, Oliogo, and Ijeze.

The postal code of the area is 322.

References

Local Government Areas in Delta State